Jacob Blessing the Sons of Joseph may refer to:
Jacob Blessing the Sons of Joseph (Rembrandt), 1656 work by Rembrandt
Jacob Blessing the Sons of Joseph (Guercino), 1620 work by Guercino